Miss Ming (born Candy Ming; 3 November 1990), also known as Candy Rainbow, is a French actress, writer and singer.

Career
She uses the nickname Candy Rainbow when she is a songwriter and the name Miss Ming when she is an actress.

Benoît Delépine met her by chance on a beach while she was reading poetry aloud, wearing home-made clothes. He then starts following her, and eventually introduces her to the world of Groland. Her first book bears the mark of the French satirical tv show.

Personal life
Since 2012, she is married to Frederick Alexander, assistant director of the movie Henri directed by Yolande Moreau.

Filmography

References

External links

 

1990 births
21st-century French actresses
French film actresses
Living people
People from Dieppe, Seine-Maritime
French artists
21st-century French singers
21st-century French women singers